Buena Creek is a station in Vista, California that is served by North County Transit District's SPRINTER light rail line. The station is located at 1923 Buena Creek Road. Although its mailing address lists Vista as the city, it is the only station along the entire line to be situated in an unincorporated portion of San Diego County. It consists of a single platform and track.

Platforms and tracks

References

External links

SPRINTER Stations

North County Transit District stations
Railway stations in the United States opened in 2008
Vista, California
2008 establishments in California